Nazeeh Johnson (born July 17, 1998) is an American football safety for the Kansas City Chiefs of the National Football League (NFL). He played college football at Marshall and was drafted by the Chiefs in the seventh round of the 2022 NFL Draft.

College career
Johnson was unranked as a recruit by 247Sports.com coming out of high school. Johnson majored in Communications and walked on to the Marshall football team. 
He started four seasons for the Herd, totaling 302 tackles, six tackles for loss, one sack, seven interceptions, 19 passes defended and a defensive touchdown.

Professional career
Johnson was drafted by the Kansas City Chiefs with the 259th pick in the seventh round of the 2022 NFL Draft. He was waived on August 30, 2022, and signed to the practice squad the next day. He was promoted to the active roster on September 28, 2022. Johnson won Super Bowl LVII when the Chiefs defeated the Philadelphia Eagles.

References

External links
 Kansas City Chiefs bio
 Marshall Thundering Herd bio

Living people
American football safeties
Marshall Thundering Herd football players
Players of American football from West Virginia
Sportspeople from Martinsburg, West Virginia
1998 births
Kansas City Chiefs players